The Order of precedence of Nepal is the protocol list (hierarchy) in which the functionaries and officials are listed according to their rank and office in the Government of Nepal. As the country embraces federalism, the government finalized a new order of precedence in April 2019. The earlier order of precedence was revised by adjusting some key positions, mainly with the provincial administrations in place. The President is at the top of protocol, followed by the Vice President and then the Prime Minister.

Order of Precedence (since 2019)

Former orders of precedence

Order of Precedence (1990–2007) 
From the start of the parliamentary monarchy system in 1990 until the abolition of the monarchy in 2007, a different Order of precedence was in force in Nepal, one which gave more precedence to royal family members and career bureaucrats and Army officers over that of Members of Parliament.

Order of Precedence (2013–2018) 
This order was endorsed by government in Feb 2013. The earlier order was made in 1990 following the restoration of democracy in which PM was in the 10th position after the members of the then royal family. But after the declaration of republic in 2008 there was absence of such state protocol for over four years.

See also 
List of heads of state by diplomatic precedence

References

Order of precedence
Nepal